Mile High Comics is an online retailer and a chain of three Colorado comic book stores founded by Chuck Rozanski in 1969 from his parents' basement in Colorado Springs, Colorado.

History
In 1969, when Chuck Rozanski was 13, he began working out of his parents' Colorado basement, selling back issues of comic books by running mail order ads in the magazine Rocket's Blast Comicollector. The following year, he began promoting comics as the youngest seller ever to exhibit at the Colorado Springs Antiques Market. In 1971, he co-founded the Colorado Springs Comics Club. The following year, he attended his first national comics convention, Multicon in Oklahoma City, where he sold US$1,800 in comics in three days. It was this point that he realized comics retailing could be a career.

Rozanski opened his first store in Boulder, Colorado in 1974 with $800 in cash and 10,000 comics. By 1977, he had expanded to four stores in the greater Denver area. In December of that year, he purchased the Edgar Church Collection, the largest and highest-quality Golden Age comics collection ever discovered. The cache had been preserved due to the unvarying 60-degree temperature and minimal humidity, and consisted of 16,000 comic books dating from 1937 to 1955, including the first Superman comic and the first Marvel Comic. The purchase of the Church Collection helped Mile High Comics expand its influence nationally, and helped bring a geometric rise to the price of rare comic books, which became a legitimate investment. Rozanski once sold a batch of comics from the Church Collection and used the profits to put a down payment on a 22,000 square-foot warehouse.
 
In 1977, Mile High Comics consisted of three locations.

In 1979 Rozanski purchased Richard Alf Comics' mail order division, with which he gained systems and methods for greatly expanding his mail order sales.

In 1980, Rozanski purchased a double-page ad in mainstream Marvel comics, listing prices for back issues he had for sale. This ad, which was the first of its kind, was a departure from the general practice of the time because of its inclusion of prices, which Rozanski explains was a way to educate non-collectors as to the value of their collections. The ad affirmed that back issues were a valid commodity for the collector's market, and led not only to a boom for Mile High Comics, but to the entire back-issue market. Mile High Comics frequently placed ads in Marvel comics in the 1980s listing back issues of comic books that could be purchased through the mail. By 1987 the company was generating $3.5 million a year in sales.

In 1993 Rozanski opened the first comics mega-store in Denver, which measured 11,000 square feet. The company eventually expanded to eight stores, and grew to become one of the most successful comics specialty shops in the United States. One of Mile High's employees, David Vinson, was hired by DC Comics in 1994 as a manager of distributor relations.

In July 2014 Rozanski announced Mile High Comics would likely end its four-decade long history of appearances at the San Diego Comic-Con, due to the proliferation of convention-exclusive variants offered by publishers and toy manufacturers to convention attendees, many of whom Rozanski criticized for attending the convention solely to acquire those exclusives in order to resell them at a higher prices on eBay. Rozanski further criticized publishers for denying these exclusives to retailers, which Rozanksi estimates cost Mile High Comics $10,000 of losses at the convention. Rozanski said that Mile High would continue its presence at other conventions such as Denver Comic Con, where Mile High's hourly sales were double those at San Diego, despite the fact that the Denver convention yielded half the attendance of San Diego. In 2017 Mile High comics announced their end of appearing at San Diego Comic-Con due to constant increase of costs and awful management of the comic con.

As of 2019, with the closing of its Lakewood store, Mile High Comics has one remaining physical location, the Jason Street Mega Store in Denver.

References

External links
 

Comics retailers
Independent bookstores of the United States
Retail companies established in 1969
1969 establishments in Colorado
Privately held companies based in Colorado
1969 in comics